Tonio Kröger is a 1964 West German historical drama film directed by Rolf Thiele, based on the 1903 novella of the same name by Thomas Mann. It was entered into the 14th Berlin International Film Festival. It was shot at the Tempelhof Studios in Berlin. The film's sets were designed by the art director Wolf Englert.

Cast
 Jean-Claude Brialy as Tonio Kröger
 Nadja Tiller as Lisaweta Iwanowna
 Werner Hinz as Consul Kröger
 Anaid Iplicjian as Frau Kröger
 Rudolf Forster as Herr Seehaase
 Walter Giller as Merchant
 Theo Lingen as Knaak
 Adeline Wagner as  Woman
 Beppo Brem as Adalbert Prantl
 Rosemarie Lucke as Inge Holm
 Elisabeth Klettenhauer as Girl
 Mathieu Carrière as Tonio as a Boy
 Gert Fröbe as Policeman Peterson

References

External links

1964 films
1964 drama films
1960s historical drama films
West German films
1960s German-language films
German black-and-white films
Films based on works by Thomas Mann
Films directed by Rolf Thiele
Films set in the 1900s
German historical drama films
Films shot at Tempelhof Studios
1960s German films